= LaVerna Hendricks =

Wyoming politician

Member of the Wyoming House of Representatives from the Converse district
- In office 1983–1984

LaVerna Hendricks is an American politician. She was elected to represent the Converse district in the Wyoming House of Representatives from 1983 to 1984.
